The IHF Beach Handball World Championships is an international beach handball competition contested by the men's and women's national teams of the member federations/associations of International Handball Federation (IHF), the sport's global governing body.

The tournament was established in 2004, taking place every two years to allow continental tournaments to flourish without the burden of the World Championship qualifiers crowding the schedule every 12 months. The current tournament format lasts over approximately 6 days and involves 16 teams initially competing in four groups of four teams. The group winners and runners-up advance to a series of knock-out stages until the champion is crowned. The losing semi-finalists play each other in a play-off match to determine the third and fourth-placed teams.

The most recent edition was held in Kazan (Russia), and crowned Brazil as champions defeating defending champions Croatia by 2–0 in the final of men's category. Debutants Greece claimed title in women's category by defeating Norway in the final by 2–1.

Men's tournament

Summary

Medal table

Participating nations

Women's tournament

Summary

Medal table

Participating nations

Overall medal count

See also
Beach handball at the World Games
Asian Beach Handball Championship
European Beach Handball Championship (disambiguation)
Oceania Beach Handball Championship
Pan American Beach Handball Championship
South and Central American Beach Handball Championship
IHF Youth Beach Handball World Championship

References

 
Beach handball competitions
Beach
Recurring sporting events established in 2004
Beach